On May 6, 2017, the city of San Antonio, Texas held an election to choose the next mayor of San Antonio. As no candidate secured a majority of the vote (50% of all votes cast +1), a runoff was held on June 10, 2017 with Councilman Ron Nirenberg defeating incumbent mayor Ivy Taylor.

Simultaneous elections to the city council as well as various area bond programs were held on the same date.

Background
Julian Castro, who was elected mayor in the 2009 San Antonio mayoral election, resigned in 2014 to become the United States Secretary of Housing and Urban Development. Ivy Taylor was selected by the San Antonio City Council as Castro's successor. Taylor successfully ran for re-election as mayor in the 2015 San Antonio mayoral election. 

On November 13, 2016, Taylor officially announced her candidacy for a second full term as mayor. City Councilman Ron Nirenberg became the first challenger to Taylor, announcing his candidacy on December 10, 2016. The chairman of the Bexar County Democratic Party, Manuel Medina, announced his candidacy on January 7, 2017. District 4 City Councilman Rey Saldaña, a potential candidate, opted to run for a fourth term to the city council rather than mayor.

Candidates
A total of 14 citizens submitted applications to be on the ballot for mayor. Taylor, Medina, and Nirenberg were identified as the primary three candidates in the election.

Declared
 Antonio "Tony" Diaz
 Felicio Hernandez Flores II
 Michael "Commander" Idrogo
 Stephen Lucke
 Napoleon Madrid
 Will McLeod
 Manuel Medina, former chairman of the Bexar County Democratic Party
 Ron Nirenberg, District 8 City Councilman
 Julie Iris "Mama Bexar" Oldham
 Gerard Xavier Ponce
 Keven Roles
 Rhett Smith
 Ivy Taylor, incumbent mayor of San Antonio and former City Councilwoman
 John Martin Velasquez

Endorsements
italicized individuals and organizations are post-regular election endorsements

Polling

 Poll for the Ivy Taylor campaign

Results

First round 
On May 6, 2017, the election for Mayor was held. None of the leading candidates received more than 50% of the vote and as a result, a runoff election was scheduled for Saturday, June 10, 2017 between the top two vote-getters.

 
 
 
 
 
 
 
 
 
 
 
 

 
 
* Vote percentage includes all of Bexar County with a total of 16,745 either voting in another municipal election or casting no ballot for San Antonio mayor.

Runoff 
The runoff election between the top two candidates was held on Saturday, June 10, 2017. 230 fewer people voted in the runoff than in the first round. This was the third consecutive runoff election in which the runner-up in the first round went on to win in the runoff. This was also the first election in twenty years that the incumbent mayor of San Antonio sought re-election and lost, when Bill Thornton sought re-election in 1997 but failed to qualify for the runoff (Thornton was ultimately succeeded by Howard Peak).

References

21st century in San Antonio
2017 Texas elections
2017 United States mayoral elections
2017
Non-partisan elections